Dino Kovačec (born 27 December 1993) is a Croatian professional footballer who plays for Varaždin.

Club career
He made his Austrian Football Bundesliga debut for SK Rapid Wien on 15 May 2016 in a game against FC Admira Wacker Mödling.

On 27 August 2020, he signed with SKU Amstetten.

References

External links
 

1993 births
Living people
Footballers from Zagreb
Association football midfielders
Croatian footballers
NK Sesvete players
NK Dubrava players
SK Rapid Wien players
WSG Tirol players
SKU Amstetten players
Austrian Regionalliga players
Austrian Football Bundesliga players
2. Liga (Austria) players
Croatian expatriate footballers
Expatriate footballers in Austria
Croatian expatriate sportspeople in Austria